Mar Chiquita Partido is a county (partido) located on the Atlantic coast of Buenos Aires Province in Argentina.

Economy
The economy of Mar Chiquita Partido is dominated by agriculture, cattle raising, and the summer tourist season (December-February).

Settlements
Coronel Vidal (pop. 6320) 
General Pirán (pop. 2896)
Mar Chiquita (pop. 394)
Santa Clara del Mar (pop. 5204)
Atlántida (pop. 586)
Camet Norte (pop. 150)
Frente Mar (pop. 77)
Mar de Cobo (pop. 406)
La Baliza (pop. 94)
La Caleta (pop. 63)
La Armonía (pop. 105)
Vivoratá (pop. 792)

References

External links

 

1839 establishments in Argentina
Partidos of Buenos Aires Province